The Sai or sometimes pronounced Sayee are a Muslim community found in the states of Bihar and  Uttar Pradesh in India. They are also known as the Sain.

Origin
The Sai are one of a number of Muslim mendicant communities traditionally connected with begging at Sufi shrines in North India. They are also involved in the manufacture of tazias for the Muharram festival, as well as grave digging. Very little is known about their origin, and they could have evolved from a number of different communities who took up the profession of begging and grave digging. The Sai are found mainly in eastern Uttar Pradesh and Bihar. They speak the Awadhi dialect, and much in common with the Jogi Faqir, another Muslim mendicant community. Most Sai claim to be of Shaikh status.

The Sayee of Bihar claim to belong to the Shaikh Siddiqui community, and claim descent from Abu Bakar, the first caliph of Islam. Like other Muslim communities of Bihar, they date their origin to the time of Bakhtiyar Khilji, the Muslim conqueror of Bihar. They have several sub-divisions, the main ones being the Madari, Rafai, Jalali, Mewati and Sada-Sohgal. They are found mainly in Patna, Gaya, Nalanda and Muzaffarpur districts. The Sayee speak Urdu, with most understanding Hindi.

Present circumstances
The Sai are endogamous, marrying within close kin. Their traditional occupation was begging, but over time a small number have acquired land, much of gifted by the other communities because of their supposed sanctity. A good many are now marginal farmers or sharecroppers. The urban Sai have remained involved in their traditional occupation of begging and grave digging. A small number of Sai are now village mullahs as well. The community are Sunni Muslims, and fairly orthodox.
 
The Sayee in Bihar are landless, with many still engaged in their traditional occupation of begging.  In some parts of Rajasthan, Sayee are called  Banwa   or  Jhunjhunwati Sayee and they are involved in singing and the band owner profession. A good many are landless agricultural labourers, while some have acquired some land. Like their Uttar Pradesh counterparts, some Sai are now employed as village mullahs.

See also
 Jogi Faqir

References

Dalit Muslim
Social groups of Uttar Pradesh
Muslim communities of Uttar Pradesh
Muslim communities of India
Shaikh clans
Social groups of Bihar
Muslim communities of Bihar